The 2017 Open Città della Disfida is a professional tennis tournament played on clay courts. It is the 18th edition of the tournament to be part of the 2017 ATP Challenger Tour. It took place in Barletta, Italy between 10 and 16 April 2017.

Point distribution

Singles main-draw entrants

Seeds

 1 Rankings are as of April 3, 2017.

Other entrants
The following players received wildcards into the singles main draw:
  Matteo Berrettini
  Matteo Donati
  Andrea Pellegrino
  Lukáš Rosol

The following player received entry into the singles main draw as a special exempt:
  Jozef Kovalík

The following player received entry into the singles main draw as an alternate:
  Kimmer Coppejans

The following players received entry from the qualifying draw:
  Jeremy Jahn
  Filip Krajinović
  Lorenzo Sonego
  Stefano Travaglia

Champions

Singles

  Aljaž Bedene def.  Gastão Elias, 7–6(7–4), 6–3.

Doubles

 Marco Cecchinato /  Matteo Donati def.  Marin Draganja /  Tomislav Draganja 6–3, 6–4.

References

Open Citta Della Disfida
Open Città della Disfida